Lawrence or Larry Knox may refer to:

 Lawrence E. Knox (1836–1873), British Army officer and founder of The Irish Times
 Lawrence H. Knox (1908–1964), African-American chemist
Larry Knox, List of DC Comics characters: L